The 2014 U.S. Figure Skating Championships were the national figure skating championships of the United States for the 2013–14 season.

The event was held in Boston, Massachusetts on January 5–12, 2014. Medals were awarded in the disciplines of men's singles, ladies' singles, pair skating, and ice dancing at the senior, junior, novice, intermediate and juvenile levels. The results were part of the U.S. selection criteria for the 2014 Winter Olympics, 2014 World Championships, 2014 World Junior Championships, and 2014 Four Continents Championships.

Overview
The 2014 event was the 100th anniversary of the U.S. Championships and the seventh time that Boston had hosted the competition. Competitors qualified at the Eastern, Midwestern, or Pacific Coast Sectional Championships or earned a bye.

Senior results

Senior men

Senior ladies

Senior pairs

Senior ice dancing

Junior results

Junior men

Junior ladies

Junior pairs

Junior ice dancing

Novice results

Novice men

Novice ladies

Novice pairs

Novice ice dancing

Intermediate results

Intermediate men

Intermediate ladies

Intermediate pairs

Intermediate ice dancing

Juvenile results

Juvenile boys

Juvenile girls

Juvenile pairs

Juvenile ice dancing

International team selections
The international teams were announced at two press conferences on January 12, 2014.

Olympic team
The nominations to the Olympic team were announced as follows:

World team
The team to the 2014 World Championships was announced as follows in January 2014 and amended in March:

Four Continents team
The team to the 2014 Four Continents Championships was announced as follows:

World Junior team
The team to the 2014 World Junior Championships was announced as follows:

References

External links
 2014 United States Figure Skating Championships results at IceNetwork
 Schedule of events at IceNetwork

2014
2014 in figure skating
2014 in American sports
January 2014 sports events in the United States
2014 in sports in Massachusetts